Laura Sofie Coucheron Gundersen (née Svendsen) (27 May 1832 – 25 December 1898) was a Norwegian actress, counted as the first native-born tragedienne, and also, in some aspect, as her country's first professional native actress and prima donna. She was associated with Christiania Theater from her debut in 1850 until her death, except for the seasons 1870-72, when she played at Møllergatens Theater.

Biography
Laura Sofie Coucheron Svendsen was born in Bergen, Norway. Her parents were Jacob Buchmann Svendsen (1792-1840) and Beate Marie Coucheron (1799-1837).
Both of her parents died while she was quite young. She had firm ambition to be an actor from her early years. In 1849, at the age of seventeen, she borrowed money from a relative and traveled to Christiania  (now Oslo).

In 1849, Norwegian actors were not employed at the official theatres in Oslo; the greatest theater in the 1840s, the Christiania Theatre, was founded by Danes and the language of the stage was Danish. Norwegian actors were treated to smaller roles. The reason given was that the Norwegian actors lacked education, as there were no acting schools in Norway. That year, however, Laura Gundersen was employed as the first and only Norwegian actor to play at the Christiania Theatre in Oslo, and became as such historical. Dating from 1856, the Christiania Theatre committed to employ more native actors. 

In 1864, she married  actor Sigvard Gundersen (1842-1904). She starred as Svanhild, alongside her husband Sigvard as Falk, in the premiere of Henrik Ibsen's Love's Comedy at the Christiania Theatre in 1873.  She played a long row of tragedies; one of the most famous was the premier of Bergljot,  a melodrama with orchestra  by Edvard  Grieg in 1885. She also starred in Ibsen's and Bjørnson's contemporary dramas. 

She played according to the Danish romantic tradition.
Her employment was the start of a new age in the cultural history of Norway, and towards the end of the 19th century, Danish and foreign dominance were broken; from 1872, Norwegian was the language of the stage, and the Norwegian stage was taken over by Norwegian actors, who often favoured a more realistic way to play, a development that led to fewer parts for Gundersen in the end of the century.

She died in Oslo and was is buried with her husband at Vår Frelsers gravlund.

See also 
 Louise Brun
 Emilie da Fonseca
 Augusta Smith

References

Other Sources
 Meyer, Michael  (1974) Ibsen: A Biography. Abridged edition. Pelican Biographies ser. Harmondsworth: Penguin.  
Schmiesing, Ann (2006)  Norway's Christiania Theatre, 1827-1867: from Danish showhouse to national stage (Fairleigh Dickinson Univ. Press)

External links
 Laura Gundersen    Oslo Museum

1832 births
1898 deaths
Actors from Bergen
19th-century Norwegian actresses
Burials at the Cemetery of Our Saviour
Actresses from Oslo